is a 1994 Japanese film directed by Hideyuki Hirayama.

Cast
 Hirozumi Sato as Bingo
 Shingo Takano as Harada
 Issey Takahashi as Namio

References

External links
 

1994 films
Films directed by Hideyuki Hirayama
1990s Japanese films